Christian Jacob Theophilus de Meza (November 26, 1756 – April 6, 1844) was Danish physician and author.

Biography
De Meza was born in Copenhagen in 1756. He was a son of the physician , together with whom he embraced Christianity in 1783. In the same year he graduated as M.D. from the University of Copenhagen, and became a member of the Royal Medical Society. From 1784 until his death he practised medicine in Elsinore.

Meza published in the medical journals numerous essays. He also wrote also a drama, Dormon og Vilhelmine, which was produced at the Royal Theatre, Copenhagen, in 1796.

Meza's son, Christian Julius de Meza (1792–1865), was a general in command of a division of the Danish army during the Second Schleswig War.

Selected bibliography
 
 
 
  Appeared afterward in Bulletin des sciences médicales (January, 1830) and in the American Journal of the Medical Sciences (no. 12, 1830).

References
 

1756 births
1844 deaths
18th-century Danish dramatists and playwrights
18th-century Danish physicians
19th-century Danish physicians
Converts to Christianity from Judaism
Danish male dramatists and playwrights
Danish people of Jewish descent